This is a list of television specials based on the Looney Tunes series of theatrical animated shorts. Note all specials were originally aired in prime-time unless otherwise noted.

Original specials

Anniversary specials

Specials with reused footage

Home Video Retitling 
Several of these TV specials were given a new name when released on video.

See also 
 Looney Tunes and Merrie Melodies filmography
 Looney Tunes
 Merrie Melodies
 Looney Tunes Golden Collection

Notes

Further reading 
 Looney Tunes and Merrie Melodies: A Complete Illustrated Guide to the Warner Bros. Cartoons, by Jerry Beck and Will Friedwald (1989), Henry Holt, 
 Chuck Amuck : The Life and Times of an Animated Cartoonist by Chuck Jones, published by Farrar Straus & Giroux, 
 That's Not All, Folks! by Mel Blanc, Philip Bashe. Warner Books,  (Softcover)  (Hardcover)
 Of Mice and Magic: A History of American Animated Cartoons, Leonard Maltin, Revised Edition 1987, Plume  (Softcover)  (Hardcover)

External links 
 The Big Cartoon DataBase entry for Merrie Melodies Cartoons and for Looney Tunes Cartoons
 Golden Age Cartoons' The Ultimate Looney Tunes and Merrie Melodies Website by Jon Cooke
 "Warner Brothers Cartoon Companion", a wealth of trivia about the Warner cartoons
 Official site

 
Looney Tunes and Merrie Melodies
Looney Tunes and Merrie Melodies